A lifestyle store is a retail store selling a wide variety of product categories under a single brand. It is designed to associate a brand with one or another aspirational lifestyle. Lifestyle stores may include clothing, housewares, furniture, stationery, gifts, and so on.

Examples of lifestyles addressed by brands include "fashionable", "active", "healthy", "back-to-basics".

The pioneer in this sector was Design Research, started in 1953. "It was the first attempt to do a lifestyle store, before anyone knew that word...." It carried an eclectic selection of products, from furniture to clothing, from toys to pots and pans, at a wide range of prices.

Lifestyle stores include:

 Design Research (defunct)
 Habitat (known as "Conran's" in the U.S.)
 Crate and Barrel
 Workbench
 Muji
 Pottery Barn

The concept is sometimes extended to retail stores that stock different product lines from the same fashion brand.

Notes

Retail formats
Lifestyle